Terms used to describe homosexuality have gone through many changes since the emergence of the first terms in the mid-19th century.  In English, some terms in widespread use have been sodomite, Achillean, Sapphic, Uranian, homophile, lesbian, gay, effeminate, queer, homoaffective, and same-sex attracted. Some of these words are specific to women, some to men, and some can be used of either. Gay people may also be identified under the umbrella terms LGBT.

Homosexual was coined in German in 1868. Academia continues to coin related terms, including androphilia and gynephilia which designate only the object of attraction, thus divorcing the terms from sexual orientation entirely.

Numerous slang terms exist for homosexuals or homosexuality. Some communities have cants, a rich jargon used among a subgroup almost like a secret language, such as Polari in the U.K., and others.

Prescribed usage

The term homosexual can be used as an adjective to describe the sexual attractions and behaviors of people attracted to the same sex. Author and gay pioneer Quentin Crisp said that the term should be "homosexualist", adding that no one says "I am a sexual." Some gay people argue that the use of homosexual as a noun is offensive, arguing that they are people first and their homosexuality being merely an attribute of their humanity. Even if they do not consider the term offensive, some people in same-sex relationships may object to being described as homosexual because they identify as bisexual+, or another orientation.

Some style guides recommend that the terms homosexual and homosexuality be avoided altogether, lest their use cause confusion or arouse controversy. In particular, the description of individuals as homosexual may be offensive, partially because of the negative clinical association of the word stemming from its use in describing same-sex attraction as a pathological state before homosexuality was removed from the American Psychiatric Association's list of mental disorders in 1973. The Associated Press and New York Times style guides restrict usage of the terms.

Same-sex oriented people seldom apply such terms to themselves, and public officials and agencies often avoid them. For instance, the Safe Schools Coalition of Washington's Glossary for School Employees advises that gay is the "preferred synonym for homosexual", and goes on to suggest avoiding the term homosexual as it is "clinical, distancing, and archaic".

However, the terms homosexual and homosexuality are sometimes deemed appropriate in referring to behavior (although same-sex is the preferred adjective). Using homosexuality or homosexual to refer to behavior may be inaccurate but does not carry the same potentially offensive connotations that using homosexual to describe a person does. When referring to people, homosexual is considered derogatory and the terms gay and lesbian are preferred. Some have argued that homosexual places emphasis on sexuality over humanity, and is to be avoided when describing a person. Gay man or lesbian are the preferred nouns for referring to people, which stress cultural and social matters over sex.

The New Oxford American Dictionary says that gay is the preferred term.

People with a same-sex sexual orientation generally prefer the terms gay, lesbian, or bisexual. The most common terms are gay (both men and women) and lesbian (women only). Other terms include same gender loving and same-sex-oriented.

Among some sectors of gay sub-culture, same-sex sexual behavior is sometimes viewed as solely for physical pleasure instead of romantic. Men on the down-low (or DL) may engage in covert sexual activity with other men while pursuing sexual and romantic relationships with women.

History

The choice of terms regarding sexual orientation may imply a certain political outlook, and different terms have been preferred at different times and in different places.

Early history
Historian and philosopher Michel Foucault argued that homosexual and heterosexual identities did not emerge until the 19th century. Prior to that time, he said, the terms described practices and not identity. Foucault cited Karl Westphal's famous 1870 article Contrary Sexual Feeling as the "date of birth" of the categorization of sexual orientation. Some scholars, however, have argued that there are significant continuities between past and present conceptualizations of sexuality, with various terms having been used for homosexuality.

In his Symposium, the ancient Greek philosopher Plato described (through the character of the profane comedian Aristophanes) three sexual orientations – heterosexuality, male homosexuality, and female homosexuality – and provided explanations for their existence using an invented creation myth.

Tribadism

Although this term refers to a specific sex act between women today, in the past it was commonly used to describe female-female sexual love in general, and women who had sex with women were called Tribads or Tribades. As author Rictor Norton explains:

The tribas, lesbian, from Greek , to rub (i.e. rubbing the pudenda together, or clitoris upon pubic bone, etc.), appears in Greek and Latin satires from the late first century. The tribade was the most common (vulgar) lesbian in European texts for many centuries. 'Tribade' occurs in English texts from at least as early as 1601 to at least as late as the mid-nineteenth century before it became self-consciously old-fashioned—it was in current use for nearly three centuries.

Fricatrice, a synonym for tribade that also refers to rubbing but has a Latin rather than a Greek root, appeared in English as early as 1605 (in Ben Jonson's Volpone). Its usage suggests that it was more colloquial and more pejorative than tribade. Variants include the Latinized confricatrice and English rubster.

Sodomy

Though sodomy has been used to refer to a range of homosexual and heterosexual "unnatural acts", the term sodomite usually refers to a homosexual male even though the real meaning is of unreproductive sex. The modern association with homosexuality can be found as early as AD 96 in the writings of the Jewish historian Josephus. In the early 5th century, Jerome, a priest, historian, and theologian used the forms Sodoman, in Sodomis, Sodomorum, Sodomæ, Sodomitæ. The modern German word  and the Norwegian  also refer to bestiality.
Sodomy in historical biblical reference may not pertain to the acts of homosexuality, but the acts of bestiality and female and male castration for the purpose of sexual slavery.

Lesbianism

Lesbian writer Emma Donoghue found that the term lesbian (with its modern meaning) has been in use in the English language from at least the 18th century. The 1732 epic poem by William King, The Toast, uses "lesbian loves" and "tribadism" interchangeably: "she loved Women in the same Manner as Men love them; she was a Tribad".

Sapphism
Named after the Greek poet Sappho who lived on Lesbos Island and wrote love poems to women, this term has been in use since at least the 18th century, with the connotation of lesbian. In 1773, a London magazine described sex between women as "Sapphic passion". The adjective form Sapphic is used nowadays as an inclusive umbrella term to encompass women who love women regardless of their identity, sexual or romantic orientation, even though it still is synonymous with lesbian.

Pederasty

Today, pederasty refers to male attraction towards adolescent boys, or the cultural institutions that support such relations, as in ancient Greece. However, in the 18th and 19th centuries, the term usually referred to male homosexuality in general. A pederast was also the active partner in anal sex, whether with a male or a female partner.

Homosexual

The word homosexual translates literally as "of the same sex", being a hybrid of the Greek prefix  meaning 'same' (as distinguished from the Latin root  meaning 'human') and the Latin root  meaning 'sex'.

The first known public appearance of the term homosexual in print is found in an 1869 German pamphlet  ("Paragraph 143 of the Prussian Penal Code and Its Maintenance as Paragraph 152 of the Draft of a Penal Code for the North German Confederation"). The pamphlet was written by Karl-Maria Kertbeny, but published anonymously. It advocated the repeal of Prussia's sodomy laws. Kertbeny had previously used the word in a private letter written in 1868 to Karl Heinrich Ulrichs.

The term was coined and originally used primarily by German psychiatrists and psychologists. Havelock Ellis in his 1901 Studies in the Psychology of Sex wrote about the evolving terminology in the area, which ended up settling on homosexuality. In the preface to the first edition (1900), Ellis calls it sexual inversion, and volume 2 of the book is titled "Sexual Inversion". In the preface to the third edition (1927) Ellis referred to it as "the study of homosexuality". Ellis reported that the first accepted scientific term was contrary sexual feeling, coined by Westphal in 1869, and used by Krafft-Ebing and others. This term was never used outside Germany, and soon went out of favor even there. The term homosexuality was invented by Kertbeny in the same year (1869) but attracted no attention for some time, later achieving prominence, and was easily translatable into many languages, including by Hirschfeld in his 1912 book , one of the top authorities in the field. Ellis continued to use both the terms sexual inversion and homosexuality in the 3rd edition, with slightly different meanings.

The first known use of homosexual in English is in Charles Gilbert Chaddock's 1892 translation of Richard von Krafft-Ebing's , a study on sexual practices. The term was popularized by the 1906 Harden–Eulenburg Affair.

The word homosexual itself had different connotations 100 years ago than today. Although some early writers used the adjective homosexual to refer to any single-gender context (such as an all-girls school), today the term implies a sexual aspect. The term homosocial is now used to describe single-sex contexts that are not of a romantic or sexual nature.

The colloquial abbreviation homo for homosexual is a coinage of the interbellum period, first recorded as a noun in 1929, and as an adjective in 1933. Today, it is often considered a derogatory epithet.

Other late 19th and early 20th century sexological terms
 Antipathic sexual instinct: deviant sexual behavior outlined in Richard von Krafft-Ebing's Pychopathia Sexualis
 Sexual inversion
 Psychosexual hermaphroditism: bisexuality. It was believed gay men desired a female body and lesbians desired a male body. Bisexuals desired to become intersex.
 The intermediate sex: similar to sexual inversion, Edward Carpenter believed gay men possessed a male body and a female temperament and vice versa for lesbians
 Similisexualism, simulsexuality or similsexualism: homosexuality
 Intersexuality
 Catamite
 Invert
 Third sex

Homophile
Coined by the German astrologist, author and psychoanalyst Karl-Günther Heimsoth in his 1924 doctoral dissertation , the term was in common use in the 1950s and 1960s by homosexual organizations and publications; the groups of this period are now known collectively as the homophile movement. Popular in the 1950s and 1960s (and still in occasional use in the 1990s, particularly in writing by Anglican clergy), the term homophile was an attempt to avoid the clinical implications of sexual pathology found with the word homosexual, emphasizing love (-phile) instead. The first element of the word, the Greek root homo-, means 'same'; it is unrelated to Latin , 'person'. However, in Norway, the Netherlands and the Flemish/Dutch part of Belgium, the term is still widely used.

Recent academic terms
Not all terms have been used to describe same-sex sexuality are synonyms for the modern term homosexuality. Anna Rüling, one of the first women to publicly defend gay rights, considered gay people a third gender, different from both men and women. Terms such as gynephilia and androphilia have tried to simplify the language of sexual orientation by making no claim about the individual's own gender identity. However, they are not commonly used.

Side 
Side describes someone who does not practice anal sex and therefore does not define himself as top, bottom or versatile.

This term is sometimes used in American literature to present an alternative to the binary classification which notes the preferred sexual position, such as top or bottom; the term side indicates one's affinity for neither of this binary classification.

Jargon and slang

Cants

There are established languages of slang (sometimes known as cants) such as Polari in Britain, Swardspeak in the Philippines, Bahasa Binan in Indonesia, Lubunca in Turkey, and Kaliardá in Greece.

Slang

A variety of LGBT slang terms have been used historically and contemporarily within the LGBT community.

In addition to the stigma surrounding homosexuality, terms have been influenced by taboos around sex in general, producing a number of euphemisms. A gay person may be described as "that way", "a bit funny", "on the bus", "batting for the other team", "a friend of Dorothy", "wearing comfortable shoes" (for women), although such euphemisms are becoming less common as homosexuality becomes more visible.

Harry Hay frequently stated that, in the 1930s–1940s, gay people referred to themselves as temperamental.

Gay
Although the word was originally synonymous with happy or cheerful, in the 20th century it gradually came to designate someone who is romantically or sexually attracted to someone of the same gender or sex.

Footnotes

References

External links

 
  "Gay Language Guide" – gay slang in various languages: French, German, Italian, Spanish, Dutch, Portuguese, Japanese, Hungarian, Russian, Thai
 "The Homophobic Alphabet Euphemism Collection": an ongoing collection of euphemisms for gay men and lesbians.
 Homosexual Terms in 18th-century Dictionaries – catamite, madge, indorser, windward passage, and more

 
Homosexuality
LGBT linguistics
Sociolinguistics